The Snezhnaya ( lit: Snowy) is a river in Buryatia and Irkutsk Oblast, Siberia, Russia.

Course
It is one of the main rivers that feeds into Lake Baikal. It is named after how most of the water in the river gets into the river: from snowmelt. The river starts in the Khamar-Daban mountains, where snow melting during warm weather (and rainfall) gets into the river and runs down the mountain.

See also
List of rivers of Russia

References

External links 

Rivers of Irkutsk Oblast
Rivers of Buryatia